Rocky Point is a census-designated place (CDP) in Kitsap County, Washington, United States.

Demographics
In 2010, it had a population of 1,564 inhabitants, 784 of whom were male, and 780 of whom were female.

Geography
Rocky Point is located in central Kitsap County at coordinates 47°35′10″N 122°40′05″W. The CDP occupies a peninsula extending north from the city of Bremerton into the tidal Dyes Inlet, ending at Rocky Point. It is bordered to the east by Port Washington Narrows and Phinney Bay and to the west by Mud Bay, separating it from a parallel peninsula containing the Marine Drive neighborhood of Bremerton.

References

Census-designated places in Kitsap County, Washington